Boodontinae is a subfamily of colubrid snakes.

Genera
It contains 22 genera.
Boaedon
Bothrolycus
Bothrophthalmus
Buhoma
Chamaelycus
Dendrolycus
Dipsina
Dromophis
Duberria
Gonionotophis
Grayia
Hormonotus
Lamprophis
Lycodonomorphus
Lycophidion
Macroprotodon
Mehelya
Montaspis
Pseudaspis
Pseudoboodon
Pythonodipsas
Scaphiophis

References

Colubrids
Snake subfamilies